Drymonia dodonides is a moth of the  family Notodontidae. It is found in Japan.

The wingspan is 32–35 mm.

External links
JPmoth

Notodontidae
Moths described in 1887
Moths of Japan
Taxa named by Otto Staudinger